Lampshade spiders, family Hypochilidae, are among the most primitive of araneomorph spiders. There are two genera and twelve species currently recognized. Like mygalomorphs, most hypochilids have two pairs of book lungs, but like araneomorphs they have intersecting fangs, with the exception of some species which have chelicerae in an angle that is neither orthognathous or labidognathous. These long-legged spiders build typical "lampshade" style webs under overhangs and in caves. In the United States the fauna is primarily associated with the Appalachian, Rocky and California Mountains. Ten of the known species are found in these ranges, all in the genus Hypochilus. The genus Ectatosticta is found in China.

In one analysis, the Hypochilidae are a sister clade to the Neocribellatae, which contains all other spider species in the Araneomorphae (Coddington & Levi, 1991, p. 576). A more recent study groups them with the Haplogynae.

Species
Ectatosticta Simon, 1892 – China
 Ectatosticta davidi (Simon, 1889)
 Ectatosticta deltshevi Platnick & Jäger, 2009

Ectatosticta baima Lin & S. Q. Li, 2021 – China
Ectatosticta baixiang Lin & S. Q. Li, 2021 – China
Ectatosticta bajie Lin & Li, 2021 – China
Ectatosticta dapeng Lin & Li, 2021 – China
Ectatosticta davidi (Simon, 1889) – China
Ectatosticta deltshevi Platnick & Jäger, 2009 – China
Ectatosticta furax Wang, Zhao, Irfan & Zhang, 2021 – China
Ectatosticta helii Lin & S. Q. Li, 2021 – China
Ectatosticta menyuanensis Wang, Zhao, Irfan & Zhang, 2021 – China
Ectatosticta pingwuensis Wang, Zhao, Irfan & Zhang, 2021 – China
Ectatosticta puxian Lin & S. Q. Li, 2021 – China
Ectatosticta qingshi Lin & S. Q. Li, 2021 – China
Ectatosticta rulai Lin & Li, 2021 – China
Ectatosticta shaseng Lin & S. Q. Li, 2021 – China
Ectatosticta shennongjiaensis Wang, Zhao, Irfan & Zhang, 2021 – China
Ectatosticta songpanensis Wang, Zhao, Irfan & Zhang, 2021 – China
Ectatosticta wenshu Lin & S. Q. Li, 2021 – China
Ectatosticta wukong Lin & Li, 2020 – China
Ectatosticta xuanzang Lin & Li, 2020 – China
Ectatosticta yukuni Lin & Li, 2021 – China
Ectatosticta zhouzhiensis Wang, Zhao, Irfan & Zhang, 2021 – China

Hypochilus Marx, 1888 – US
Hypochilus bernardino Catley, 1994 – USA
Hypochilus bonneti Gertsch, 1964 – USA
Hypochilus coylei Platnick, 1987 – USA
Hypochilus gertschi Hoffman, 1963 – USA
Hypochilus jemez Catley, 1994 – USA
Hypochilus kastoni Platnick, 1987 – USA
Hypochilus petrunkevitchi Gertsch, 1958 – USA
Hypochilus pococki Platnick, 1987 – USA
Hypochilus sheari Platnick, 1987 – USA
Hypochilus thorelli Marx, 1888 (type) – USA
Hypochilus xomote (Hedin & Ciaccio, 2022) – USA

See also
 List of Hypochilidae species
 Spider families

References

Further reading
 Forster, R.R., Platnick, N.I. and Gray, M.R. (1987). A review of the spider superfamilies Hypochiloidea and Austrochiloidea (Araneae, Araneomorphae). Bulletin of the AMNH 185(1):1-116 Abstract - PDF (50Mb)

External links

 Arachnology Home Pages: Araneae
 Platnick, N.I. 2003. World Spider Catalog
 Picture of Hypochilus pococki
 

Cave spiders
Hypochilidae
Spiders of North America
Spiders of China